The Florida Western and Northern Railroad was a subsidiary of the Seaboard Air Line Railroad that expanded their network in the 1920s by building a rail line from Coleman, Florida (near Wildwood) all the way to West Palm Beach via Auburndale and Sebring (near Lake Okeechobee), a distance of 204 miles.  The line would be extended to Miami by the Seaboard-All Florida Railway, another Seaboard Air Line subsidiary, shortly after with the full line from Coleman to Miami becoming the Seaboard Air Line's Miami Subdivision.  The line is still in service today from Auburndale to West Palm Beach and is now operated by Seaboard successor CSX Transportation as their Auburndale Subdivision.

Route description

The Florida Western and Northern Railroad began in Coleman, which was located on the Seaboard Air Line Railroad's main line about five miles south of Wildwood (where the Seaboard Air Line operated a major yard).  It branched off the main line in Coleman and proceeded south through wetlands of north Central Florida in a nearly straight line down to Auburndale, where it crossed the Atlantic Coast Line Railroad's main line (the current CSX A Line).  From here, it continued through southern Central Florida, passing through Winter Haven, West Lake Wales, Avon Park, and Sebring.  Between Auburndale and Sebring, the line's trajectory closely paralleled the Atlantic Coast Line Railroad's Haines City Branch, which at one point ran from Haines City to Everglades City.

After Sebring, the line turned into a more southeast trajectory towards Okeechobee.  From here, it continued southeast near the northern edge of Lake Okeechobee in a nearly straight line southeast to Indiantown and to its terminus in West Palm Beach.

History
The Seaboard Air Line Railroad first chartered the Florida Western and Northern Railroad in April 1924 and construction began shortly after.  The line was beginning of Seaboard president S. Davies Warfield's ambitious plan to connect the Seaboard network to the South Florida region, which for almost thirty years had been the exclusive domain of the Florida East Coast Railway.  The line's final spike was placed on January 21, 1925, and four days later, a special section of the Seaboard's Orange Blossom Special ran to West Palm Beach officially inaugurating service.  President Warfield was on board with around 500 guests.

To accommodate large amounts of traffic bound for Miami, the Seaboard Air Line also double-tracked its main line from the junction in Coleman to Wildwood Yard.

The line only briefly terminated in West Palm Beach before Seaboard organized another subsidiary, the Seaboard-All Florida Railway, to extend it to Miami which was completed in January 1927.  The Seaboard would designate the line from Coleman to Miami as their Miami Subdivision.

The Seaboard Air Line ran a number of intercity passenger services on the line including the Orange Blossom Special, Silver Meteor, Silver Star, the Sunland, and the Palmland.  The Cross State Limited also ran the line, which was one of the first rail services to connect Tampa and Miami directly.  The Cross State Limited ran the Valrico Subdivision from West Lake Wales to access Tampa.

In 1963, the line began hosting the Atlantic Coast Line Railroad's Miami-bound passenger trains.  This arrangement between Seaboard and its competitor was quickly made due to the abrupt discontinuation of passenger service on the Florida East Coast Railway, which the Atlantic Coast Line (ACL) had used prior.  By then, merger talks were underway between the two railroads.  The merger would be complete by 1967 and the new combined company would be named the Seaboard Coast Line Railroad.

The line remained mostly unchanged through the Seaboard Coast Line (SCL) era.  It became their main route through southern Central Florida and segments of the Atlantic Coast Line's parallel Haines City Branch were abandoned.  Remaining segments of the Haines City branch became smaller branches of the Florida Western and Northern line including a short branch into Avon Park, as well as trackage now operated by the Florida Midland Railroad (Lake Wales to Frostproof) and the South Central Florida Express.

In 1989, a few years after Seaboard Coast Line became CSX, the northern section of the line from Coleman to just north of Auburndale was abandoned and removed.  It carried Amtrak's Miami service up until its removal, which was then shifted to its current routing along the A Line.  Most of the former right-of-way of the abandoned northern segment is now part of the nearly 30-mile General James A. Van Fleet State Trail, as well as the adjoining Auburndale TECO Trail.

Current operations

Today, the remaining trackage of the original Florida Western and Northern Railroad remains in service under CSX Transportation.  It is now CSX's Auburndale Subdivision from its junction with the A Line in Auburndale to Mangonia Park just northwest of West Palm Beach.  The line south of Mangonia Park is now the South Florida Rail Corridor, which is owned by the Florida Department of Transportation.

All of Amtrak's passenger service to Miami including the Silver Meteor and Silver Star service continue to traverse the line from Auburndale to access Miami.  A short spur known as McDonald Connection connects the Auburndale Subdivision with the CSX A Line towards Tampa.  The Auburndale Subdivision runs in a roughly parallel trajectory to U.S. Route 27 between Avon Park and Sebring, and from Okeechobee to West Palm Beach, the line directly parallels State Road 710 which in some places known as Warfield Boulevard (named after Seaboard president S. Davies Warfield).

All CSX freight trains to and from Miami also run the line.  Freight trains also notably serve the Palm Center Automotive Terminal just west of Jupiter and CSX's Winter Haven Intermodal Logistics Center in Winter Haven which opened in 2014.  A short spur known as Mission Spur splits from the line in Mangonia Park just north of the South Florida Rail Corridor boundary.  Mission Spur connects with the Florida East Coast Railway’s Lewis Terminal track, which connects to FEC’s main line.

CSX also uses the line to interchange freight with two shortline railroads: the Florida Midland Railroad in Winter Haven and West Lake Wales and with the South Central Florida Express (which is owned by U.S. Sugar) in Sebring.

Historic stations

References

CSX Transportation lines
Rail infrastructure in Florida
Defunct Florida railroads
Predecessors of the Seaboard Air Line Railroad
1925 establishments in Florida
Seaboard Air Line Railroad